Karksi Airfield (ICAO: EEKI) is an airfield in Karksi-Nuia, Viljandi County, Estonia.

The airfield's owner is the organization Mulgimaa Elu Edendamise Keskus.

References

Airports in Estonia
Buildings and structures in Viljandi County
Mulgi Parish